Also Rising is the fourth studio album by SubArachnoid Space, released on April 8, 2003 by Strange Attractors Audio House.

Track listing

Personnel 
Adapted from the Also Rising liner notes.

SubArachnoid Space
 Chris Van Huffel – drums, percussion
 Melynda Jackson – guitar, organ (1)
 Mason Jones – guitar
 Stoo Odom – bass guitar

 Andey Koa Stephens - bass guitar on “Tigris”
Production and additional personnel
 Myles Boisen – mastering
 Joe Goldring – engineering, mixing, Hammond organ (2)
 Loren Rhoads – photography
 Desmond Shea – mixing (5)

Release history

References 
https://www.discogs.com/SubArachnoid-Space-Bardo-Pond-Tigris-Euphrates/release/1745620

External links 
 Also Rising at Discogs (list of releases)

2003 albums
SubArachnoid Space albums